Taxi Girl is a 1977  commedia sexy all'italiana co-written and directed by Michele Massimo Tarantini.

Plot  
A sexy hooker comes up with a plan to operate her own taxi service for her fellow streetwalkers as a safe way to make easy money.

Cast
Edwige Fenech: Marcella
Aldo Maccione: Adone Adonis
Michele Gammino: Walter
Gianfranco D'Angelo: Isidoro
Alvaro Vitali: Alvaro
George Hilton: Ramon
Enzo Cannavale: Commissioner Angelini
Giacomo Rizzo: Rocco, Adonis' Secretary  
Gastone Pescucci: film director
Rossana Di Lorenzo: Ornella
Franco Diogene: sheikh Abdul Lala
Franca Scagnetti: Arab woman
Enzo Liberti: Marcella's father
Adriana Facchetti: Marcella's mother

See also    
 List of Italian films of 1977

References

External links

1977 films
Commedia sexy all'italiana
1970s police comedy films
1970s sex comedy films
Films directed by Michele Massimo Tarantini
Films shot in Rome
Films set in Rome
1977 comedy films
1970s Italian-language films
1970s Italian films